Molly Colleen Goodenbour (born February 8, 1972) is an American former college basketball coach and former professional basketball player who is the current women's basketball head coach at the University of San Francisco. Goodenbour previously was head coach at Santa Rosa Junior College, UC Irvine, and Cal State Dominguez Hills.

College career
Goodenbour graduated from Waterloo West High School in Waterloo, Iowa and went on to play basketball at Stanford from 1989 to 1993. Goodenbour was a freshman reserve guard on Stanford's 1990 National Championship team. As a junior in 1992, she was named Most Outstanding Player as Stanford won their 2nd national championship in 1992. In the tournament, she set the record for most three-pointers made with 18.

USA Basketball
Goodenbour was named to the team representing the US at the 1995 Pan American Games, however, only four teams committed to participate, so the event was cancelled.

Professional career
Following her college career, Goodenbour played professional basketball for Linkspring Dambasket in Sweden in the 1995–96 season. She joined the Richmond Rage of the American Basketball League in 1996–97, who played in the inaugural ABL Championship. Goodenbour played in 40 games with 11 starts. She averaged 20.2 minutes per game, 7.3 points, 1.4 assists and 2.0 rebounds. She was sixth in the ABL in three-point field goal percentage with .411. During the playoffs, Goodenbour started all seven games for the Rage and averaged 8 points.

Goodenbour signed with the New England Blizzard during the off-season, but was traded to the Portland Power on August 25, 1997 in exchange for a third round pick in the 1998 ABL Draft. During the 1998 ABL Draft, the San Jose Lasers drafted Goodenbour, as she joined the league as an undrafted free agent. She never signed with the Lasers and retired from playing.

Coaching career
Goodenbour coached women's basketball for one year in 1994–95 for the University of San Francisco before embarking on her professional career. She returned to coaching in 2002 as associate head coach at Santa Rosa Junior College. She became head coach in 2003, guiding the team to two conference titles. She was named Bay Valley Conference Coach of the Year in 2005. In 2005, she returned to USF as lead assistant coach for one season, then was hired as head coach for the Chico State Wildcats in 2006. She was named California Collegiate Athletic Association Coach of the Year in 2008 as the Wildcats compiled a 28–6 record and finished the season ranked 17th in the Division II Coaches Poll.

Goodenbour was hired to coach women's basketball at UC Irvine in 2008, where she remained for four years. On February 28, 2012, UC Irvine suspended Goodenbour for one game without pay for making what the university called an "insensitive" remark towards a student who had a disability. UC Irvine later placed Goodenbour on administrative leave from March 23 through the end of her contract on August 4; the university decided not to renew Goodenbour's contract. Goodenbour had a 44–76 overall record at UC Irvine in four seasons.

On May 30, 2012, Goodenbour was hired as head coach at Cal State Dominguez Hills, replacing Van Girard, the winningest women's basketball head coach in the program's history.  With her hire, Goodenbour became the fourth head coach in CSUDH women's basketball history.

On June 8, 2016, Cal State East Bay hired Goodenbour as head women's basketball coach, after Suzy Barcomb moved up to Division I Seattle.

Less than four months later on September 28, 2016, Goodenbour was hired as San Francisco's ninth head women's basketball coach after her former Stanford Cardinal teammate and previous Dons coach Jennifer Azzi resigned from the post as head coach two weeks earlier.

Personal
Goodenbour is married to Pat Fuscaldo, head men's basketball coach at Sonoma State University.

Head coaching record

Junior college

College

References

1972 births
Living people
American expatriate basketball people in Sweden
American women's basketball coaches
American women's basketball players
Basketball coaches from Iowa
Basketball players from Iowa
Junior college women's basketball coaches in the United States
Portland Power players
Richmond Rage players
San Francisco Dons women's basketball coaches
Sportspeople from Waterloo, Iowa
Stanford Cardinal women's basketball players
UC Irvine Anteaters women's basketball coaches
Guards (basketball)